Mad for Each Other is a 2021 South Korean television series starring Jung Woo and Oh Yeon-seo. It aired from May 24 to June 21, 2021 on KakaoTV and Netflix on Mondays, Tuesdays and Wednesdays.

Synopsis
Noh Hwi-oh (Jung Woo) works as a detective. He thinks that he has a pretty decent life. One day, an incident takes place. This causes Noh Hwi-oh's life to change. He becomes a crazy guy, unable to control his anger and he gets angry at everything. He tries to return to former self, but, during this time, he gets involved with another crazy person, Lee Min-kyung (Oh Yeon-seo). She has a sophisticated appearance and a fine job, but something happens to her. Her ordinary life collapses and she doesn't trust anyone anymore. She has delusions and is compulsive. Noh Hwi-oh and Lee Min-kyung become attracted to each other.

Cast

Main
 Jung Woo as Noh Hwi-oh: a detective in the violent crimes division of the Gangnam Police Station.
 Oh Yeon-seo as Lee Min-kyung: a woman who is caught up in her own delusions and compulsions.

Supporting
 Baek Ji-won as Kim In-ja
 Lee Hye-eun as Choi Sun-young
 Lee Yeon-doo as Lee Joo-ri
 Lee Su-hyun as Lee Su-hyun
 Ahn Woo-yeon as Lee Sang-yeob
 Seo Hye-won as Survey woman

Accolades

References

External links
  
 
 
 

South Korean comedy television series
South Korean romance television series
2021 South Korean television series debuts
2021 South Korean television series endings
Korean-language Netflix exclusive international distribution programming

ko:이 구역의 미친 X